Sean Tse Ka Keung (born 3 May 1992) is an English-born Hong Kong professional footballer who is currently a free agent.

Club career

Manchester City
Tse was born in Salford, Greater Manchester, to a Hong Kongese father and an English mother of Irish descent. He went on trial with Manchester United in 2004 before joining Manchester City at under-14 level in September 2005. He spent the majority of seasons in the academy team, and was voted the Academy Player of the Month in November 2009.

South China
In August 2012, despite being linked with Oldham Athletic, Tse signed for Hong Kong side South China. He made his Hong Kong First Division League debut on 2 September 2012, coming on as a 74th-minute substitute in a 5–2 win over Yokohama FC Hong Kong at Hong Kong Stadium.

Tai Po
On 8 August 2017, Tai Po announced that they had signed Tse.

R&F
On 3 August 2018, it was confirmed that R&F had signed Tse. On 14 October 2020, Tse left the club after his club's withdrawal from the HKPL in the new season.

Kitchee
On 17 February 2021, Kitchee announced the signing of Tse. 

On 1 July 2022, Tse left the club.

International career
Tse is eligible for the Republic of Ireland through his maternal grand-parentage. Tse was called up for Republic of Ireland national under-17 team in April 2009 for two under-17 friendlies against Poland but he absented these two matches.

He has also shown interest in joining the Hong Kong national team and was listed on the training squad roster for the 2013 EAFF East Asian Cup in 2012. He was then called up by Kim Pan-Gon, the Hong Kong head coach, for the 2013 Guangdong–Hong Kong Cup.

As of June 2020, Tse is in the final stages of receiving his Hong Kong passport.

On 18 August 2021, Tse was granted the HKSAR passport, making him eligible to represent Hong Kong internationally. 

On 8 June 2022, Tse made his international debut for Hong Kong in the Asian Cup qualifiers against Afghanistan.

Career statistics

Club
As of 16 April 2022

International 
As of 24 September 2022

Honours
South China
Hong Kong First Division: 2012–13
Hong Kong Senior Shield: 2013–14

References

External links

1992 births
Living people
Footballers from Salford
English footballers
Hong Kong footballers
Hong Kong international footballers
English people of Hong Kong descent
English people of Irish descent
Hong Kong people of English descent
Hong Kong people of Irish descent
Hong Kong First Division League players
Hong Kong Premier League players
Manchester City F.C. players
South China AA players
Tai Po FC players
R&F (Hong Kong) players
Kitchee SC players
Association football defenders
Association football central defenders
Association football midfielders